Afterglow Live is a 2004 live CD and DVD package by Sarah McLachlan.

DVD track listing
All songs written by Sarah McLachlan, except where noted.

"Fallen" – 4:19
"World on Fire" – 5:07 (McLachlan, Pierre Marchand)
"Adia" – 4:01
"Hold On" – 5:55
"Perfect Girl" – 4:36 (McLachlan, Marchand)
"Drifting" – 6:04
"Push" – 4:12
"I Will Remember You" – 4:16 (McLachlan, Seamus Egan, Merenda)
"Ice" – 4:43
"Wait" – 4:51
"Witness" – 6:15 (McLachlan, Marchand)
"Answer" – 3:59
"Angel" – 5:45
"Fear" – 5:15
"Train Wreck" – 3:41
"Building a Mystery" – 4:52 (McLachlan, Marchand)
"Sweet Surrender" – 4:19
"Possession" – 6:32
"Blackbird" – 3:02 (John Lennon, Paul McCartney)
"Ice Cream" – 3:28
"Stupid" – 5:52
"Fumbling Towards Ecstasy" – 7:03 (McLachlan, Marchand)
"Dirty Little Secret" – 5:53

CD track listing

"Fallen" – 3:51
"World on Fire" – 4:13 (McLachlan, Marchand)
"Adia" – 4:03
"Hold On" – 5:53
"Perfect Girl" – 4:36 (McLachlan, Marchand)
"Push" – 4:04
"I Will Remember You" – 3:37 (McLachlan, Seamus Egan, Merenda)
"Witness" – 6:02 (McLachlan, Marchand)
"Answer" – 3:46
"Angel" – 5:30
"Train Wreck" – 3:54
"Building a Mystery" – 4:06 (McLachlan, Marchand)
"Sweet Surrender" – 3:59
"Stupid" – 3:35
"Dirty Little Secret" – 6:32

Personnel
Sarah McLachlan – vocals, guitar, piano
Ashwin Sood – vocals, drums, percussion
Luke Doucet – vocals, guitar
Sean Ashby – vocals, guitar
Vincent Jones – vocals, keyboards
Brian Minato – vocals, bass guitar
Dave Kershaw – keyboards, bass guitar
Kathryn Rose – vocals

Charts

Weekly charts

Year-end charts

Certifications and sales

!colspan=3|DVD
|-

!colspan=3|Album
|-

Afterglow Remixes Digital EP

Afterglow Remixes Digital EP was a free, download-only EP released simultaneously with Afterglow Live. Customers who bought the album in stores were invited to visit www.download-disc.com and use a unique code to download rare remixes from the Afterglow album. Each track was available in Windows WMA audio format only and included DRM which limited the redistribution of the tracks, although burning the tracks to a CD was encouraged. Customers were given an empty CD slipcase in which to place the CD they burned.

Track listing
"World on Fire" (Junkie XL Mix)
"Stupid" (Dusted Mix) – 3:51
"Fallen" (Gabriel & Dresden Anti-Gravity Mix) – 10:26
"World on Fire" (Solarstone "Afterhours" Mix) – 8:42

Track 1: Written by Sarah McLachlan and Pierre Marchand. Remix & additional production by Junkie XL.
Track 2: Written by Sarah McLachlan. Remix & additional production by Rollo & Mark Bates (Dusted).
Track 3: Written by Sarah McLachlan. Remix & additional production by Josh Gabriel & Dave Dresden.
Track 4: Written by Sarah McLachlan and Pierre Marchand. Remix & additional production by Rich Mowatt & Andy Bury.

References

Sarah McLachlan live albums
Live video albums
2004 video albums
2004 live albums
Nettwerk Records live albums
Arista Records live albums
Nettwerk Records video albums
Arista Records video albums
Sarah McLachlan video albums